Creeping mint is a common name for several plants and may refer to:

Meehania cordata, native to the eastern United States
Mentha satureioides, native to Australia